Killers may refer to:

Films
 Killers (2000 film), a BBC Television off-drama written by David Rock
 Killers (2003 film), a compilation of five short films by Japanese directors
 Killers (2010 film), an action comedy film directed by Robert Luketic
 Killers (2014 film), a psychological thriller film directed by the Mo Brothers

Music
 Killers (metal band), heavy metal band formed in 1991, led by Paul Di'Anno

Albums
 Live Killers (1979), live album by British rock band Queen
 Killers (Iron Maiden album) (1981) second album from British heavy metal band Iron Maiden and its title track
 Killers (Kiss album) (1982), greatest hits album from the American hard rock band Kiss

Songs
 "Killers", a song by Motörhead from the 2004 album Inferno
 "Killers", a song by Kings of Convenience from the 2021 album Peace or Love

See also
 "Killerz", an episode of Law & Order
 Killer (disambiguation)
 The Killers (disambiguation)